Santiago Guarderas Izquierdo (born 1964) is an Ecuadorian politician and lawyer. He is the Metropolitan Mayor of Quito since 30 September 2021.

Early life
Born in 1964, he studied law at Pontifical Catholic University of Ecuador in Quito. He worked on the faculty at the same institution.

Career
Guarderas was elected to the National Congress in January 2007 as a member of the Social Christian Party. He left office when the assembly was dissolved in November 2007. He unsuccessfully ran for the National Assembly in 2017.

In 2019, he became Vice Mayor of Quito alongside Jorge Yunda as Mayor. In July 2021, he assumed the role of mayor when there was a leadership dispute with Yunda during protests.

On 30 September 2021, Guarderas succeeded Yunda as Quito's mayor.

References

External links

Living people
1964 births
21st-century Ecuadorian politicians
Mayors of Quito